Jacques Mandelbaum (born 1 May 1958, in Neuilly-sur-Seine) is a French journalist and film critic, currently working for the newspaper Le Monde which he joined in 1995. He is the author of numerous works on the cinema including a biographical book on Jean-Luc Godard.

Publications 
1999: Hou Hsiao-hsien, collectif, éditions Les Cahiers du cinéma
2001: Jacques Rozier le funambule, collectif, éditions Les Cahiers du cinéma
2007: Jean-Luc Godard, éditions Les Cahiers du cinéma, 
2007: Le Cinéma et la Shoah, collectif, éditions Les Cahiers du cinéma
2008: Ingmar Bergman, éditions Les Cahiers du cinéma, 
2009: Anatomie d'un film, Grasset,

External links 
 Jacques Mandelbaum on data.bnf.fr
 Le mépris de Jacques Mandelbaum, critique au « Monde », quand il dénigre « La rafle » on Riposte laïque
 Jacques Mandelbaum on The New Yorker

French film critics
20th-century French journalists
21st-century French journalists
People from Neuilly-sur-Seine
1958 births
Living people